Yuli-Yoel Edelstein (born 5 August 1958) is an Israeli politician who served as Minister of Health from 2020 to 2021. One of the most prominent refuseniks in the Soviet Union, he was the 16th Speaker of the Knesset from 2013 until his resignation on 25 March 2020.

Early life

Yuli Edelstein was born in Chernivtsi in the Soviet Union (now Ukraine) to a Jewish family. His mother, Anita Edelstein, was Jewish, while his father, Yuri Edelstein, is the son of a Jewish father and Christian mother. Both converted to Christianity, and Yuri is now a Russian Orthodox priest in Karabanovo of Kostroma Oblast named Father Georgy. While his parents taught at universities in the countryside, Edelstein was raised by his maternal grandparents. His grandfather had taught himself Hebrew at the age of 70 and used to listen to the Voice of Israel on a shortwave radio. When Edelstein's grandfather died, Yuli began to study Hebrew and read books such as Exodus by Leon Uris.

In 1977, during his second year of university, Edelstein applied for an exit visa to emigrate to Israel. Turned down, he began to associate with a small group of Hebrew teachers who held classes in their apartments. One of Edelstein's students was refusenik Alexander Smukler. In 1979, alongside Ephraim Kholmianski and Yuri Koroshovsky, Edelstein founded an underground organization, known as the 'City Project', with the intent of training Hebrew teachers and distributing Hebrew learning materials. That year, he was expelled from university and suffered harassment by the KGB and local police. During this time, he found odd jobs as a street cleaner, security guard, and more.

In 1984, he and other Hebrew teachers were arrested on fabricated charges, Edelstein himself being charged with possession of drugs, and sentenced to three years. He was then sent to Siberian penal colonies and did hard labor, first in Buryatia and then in Novosibirsk. He broke several bones after falling from a construction tower. He was due to be transferred back to Buryatia, but his wife, Tanya, threatened to go on hunger strike if he was returned there.

Edelstein was released in May 1987, on the eve of Israeli Independence Day, the next to last of the refuseniks to be freed. He then emigrated to Israel, moving to the West Bank settlement of Alon Shvut. He did his national service in the Israel Defense Forces, attaining the rank of Corporal.

Political career

Early career 

Initially a member of the National Religious Party and a vice-president of the Zionist Forum, Edelstein founded the Yisrael BaAliyah party together with fellow Soviet dissident Natan Sharansky. He was elected to the Knesset in 1996, and was appointed Minister of Immigrant Absorption in Benjamin Netanyahu's Likud-led government. The long-term project of subsidizing housing for elderly migrants prepared by the ministry under his supervision and cooperation with the Ministry of Construction raised controversy over expenditures overrun incurred by the project. Edelstein claimed that the investigative commission found such claims unsubstantiated. He was re-elected in 1999, and was appointed Deputy Immigrant Absorption Minister by Ariel Sharon in 2001.

He retained his seat in the 2003 elections, shortly after which Yisrael BaAliyah merged into Likud. Although Edelstein lost his seat in the 2006 elections, in which Likud was reduced to 12 seats (Edelstein was 14th on the party's list), he re-entered the Knesset as a replacement for Dan Naveh in February 2007. He retained his seat in the 2009 elections after being placed twelfth on the party's list, and was appointed Minister of Information and Diaspora in the Netanyahu government. He was subsequently re-elected in 2013 after being placed on the eighteenth spot of the Likud Yisrael Beiteinu list.

Speaker of the Knesset 
Following the 2013 elections, Edelstein was nominated by Likud Yisrael Beitenu to replace then Speaker of the Knesset Reuven Rivlin. His nomination was approved by all members of the party's parliamentary caucus excluding Rivlin, who chose to abstain. It was then approved by the Knesset, with 96 members voting in favor and 8 abstaining. Edelstein was sworn in as speaker on 14 March. Edelstein was elected to the third place on the Likud list ahead of the 2015 election. He was subsequently re-elected to the Knesset and then as Speaker, with 103 Members of the Knesset voting in favor and 7 abstaining. During his tenure as speaker, Edelstein supported the Nation-State Bill. Ahead of the April 2019 election, Edelstein was elected to the second place on the Likud list. After the election, he was re-elected as Speaker, with 101 MKs voting in favor and 4 abstaining.

Following the 2020 election, a bloc led by Netanyahu and Benny Gantz agreed to replace Edelstein as speaker of the Knesset. Despite this he refused to convene the plenary to vote on his replacement. The Movement for Quality Government in Israel appealed to the Supreme Court, which ordered Edelstein to convene the Knesset. on 25 march, Edelstein resigned as speaker to prevent a constitutional crisis. On March 26, Gantz was elected and sworn in as the new Knesset Speaker.

After speakership 
Following the establishment of the Thirty-fifth government, Edelstein was sworn in as Minister of Health on 17 May 2020, and remained as minister until the Thirty-sixth government was sworn in on 13 June 2021. On 11 October, he announced his intention to challenge Netanyahu for the Leadership of the Likud in the next leadership election. Ahead of the 2022 election, he withdrew from the race, leading to its cancellation due to a lack of candidates. In primaries for the party list held in August, Edelstein was placed on the 18th place on the Likud list.

Statements
In December 2014, in an interview with The Jerusalem Post, Edelstein warned world leaders against creating a Palestinian state that he thought would go to war with Israel.

In the same interview, Edelstein stated that he believes in Israeli-Palestinian coexistence. In 2014, he was one of several Members of the Knesset (MK) who submitted complaints against Arab-Israeli Haneen Zoabi for supporting Hamas, which led to her six-month suspension. "I have been in the Knesset for almost 19 years," Edelstein said. "I remember Arab MKs joining me at the March of the Living and proposing social-oriented legislation with me. That is definitely not Zoabi. I believe in coexistence and fighting against those who harm it and I think that Zoabi’s words and actions hurt coexistence. People hear her and think all Arabs must hate us and want to kill us. That is unhealthy, and we have to put an end to it.”

Edelstein criticized U.S. presidential candidate Bernie Sanders for saying that U.S. military aid to Israel should instead be diverted toward aid to Palestinians in the Hamas-run Gaza Strip. Edelstein said that Sanders should 'stop talking nonsense'.

Personal life
After leaving Alon Shvut, Edelstein moved to Neve Daniel, another settlement in the West Bank. He was married to Tatiana (Tanya) Edelstein, who was a Zionist activist, for 33 years. They met in the Soviet Union when she attended a Hebrew class he was teaching. After immigrating to Israel, she worked as a civil engineer at the Civil Aviation Authority. Tanya and Yuli Edelstein had two children together. In 2014, Tanya died of cancer at the age of 63.

In June 2016, Edelstein married Irina Nevzlin, chair of the board of directors of The Museum of the Jewish People at Beit Hatfutsot and President of the NADAV Foundation.

References

External links

Yuli Edelstein – Web Page

1958 births
Living people
Bukovina Jews
Deputy ministers of Israel
Deputy Speakers of the Knesset
Israeli people of Ukrainian-Jewish descent
People from Alon Shvut
Israeli settlers
Jewish Israeli politicians
Likud politicians
Members of the 14th Knesset (1996–1999)
Members of the 15th Knesset (1999–2003)
Members of the 16th Knesset (2003–2006)
Members of the 17th Knesset (2006–2009)
Members of the 18th Knesset (2009–2013)
Members of the 19th Knesset (2013–2015)
Members of the 20th Knesset (2015–2019)
Members of the 21st Knesset (2019)
Members of the 22nd Knesset (2019–2020)
Members of the 25th Knesset (2022–)
Naturalized citizens of Israel
People from Chernivtsi
Refuseniks
Political prisoners
Speakers of the Knesset
Soviet emigrants to Israel
Soviet Jews
Ukrainian emigrants to Israel
Yisrael BaAliyah politicians
Recipients of the Order of Skanderbeg (1990–)
Members of the 23rd Knesset (2020–2021)
Ministers of Health of Israel